Marcus Clyde Brimage (born April 6, 1985) is a retired American mixed martial artist who competed in the Featherweight division. A professional competitor since 2007, he has formerly competed for the UFC and was a competitor on The Ultimate Fighter: Team Bisping vs. Team Miller. He is perhaps best known for his fight against Conor McGregor, who was making his UFC debut.

Background
Brimage interest in martial arts began after seeing an episode of Dragon Ball Z, and watching a highlight reel of Quinton Jackson during high school. Brimage played football throughout his youth into high school, first at John Carroll Catholic High  and then at Pinson Valley High School. After graduating, and playing football was over, Brimage attended Wallace State Community College before graduating from Faulkner University with a bachelor's in criminal justice.

Mixed martial arts career

Early career
Brimage continued to work out, but was still looking to keep his competitive spirit alive. Brimage began training at a local Muay Thai gym by recommendation from one of his staff sergeants in the military. There Brimage met Chris Connelly, with whom he later opened up a gym, Spartan Fitness, in 2006. Shortly after Brimage began fighting as an amateur, collecting a 10–0 record before turning professional in 2007.

Professional career
In March 2007 Brimage made his professional debut for Georgia Fighting Championships. Brimage fought and defeated Jason Kwast via unanimous decision. Ten months later Brimage returned to competition against future Bellator fighter Bryan Goldsby. Brimage defeated Goldsby via TKO in the second round of the fight.

A month after his second professional fight Brimage was selected for BET's reality television show Iron Ring. Brimage lost his only fight for the promotion against Joey Camacho via submission. Due to injuries Brimage was forced into a more than two-year hiatus from MMA. Brimage again returned to MMA against former UFC veteran Kyle Bradley, defeating him via first-round TKO.

Before going to appear on The Ultimate Fighter 14 Brimage moved to Coconut Creek, Florida, to train full-time with the American Top Team.

The Ultimate Fighter
Brimage was selected to appear on both The Ultimate Fighter 8 and The Ultimate Fighter: United States vs. United Kingdom but due to injuries was never allowed to get onto the show. In 2011, Brimage dropped to the featherweight division, and signed with the UFC to compete on The Ultimate Fighter: Team Bisping vs. Team Miller. In the first episode, Brimage fought Bryson Wailehua-Hansen; winning via TKO in the second round. The win gained Brimage entry into the Ultimate Fighter house. He was selected as a part of Team Bisping.

Brimage next fought against former WEC fighter Bryan Caraway. Brimage lost the fight in the second round via submission (rear-naked choke).

Ultimate Fighting Championship
Brimage officially made his UFC and featherweight debut on December 3, 2011, at The Ultimate Fighter 14 Finale against Ultimate Fighter castmate Stephen Bass. Brimage won the fight via unanimous decision (30–27, 30–27, 29–28).

Brimage then faced Strikeforce import Maximo Blanco, on April 21, 2012, at UFC 145. After three close, methodical rounds, Brimage won the fight via split decision.

Brimage fought undefeated featherweight prospect Jimy Hettes on September 22, 2012, at UFC 152. Brimage defeated Hettes via unanimous decision, giving Hettes his first professional loss.

Brimage faced UFC newcomer Conor McGregor on April 6, 2013, at UFC on Fuel TV 9. He lost the fight in just over a minute of the first round by TKO.

After a year off due to injuries, Brimage returned to face Russell Doane in a bantamweight bout on July 5, 2014, at UFC 175. He lost the fight by split decision.

Brimage was expected to face Erik Perez on November 15, 2014, at UFC 180.  However, Perez pulled out of the bout in mid-October citing a shoulder injury.

Brimage was quickly rescheduled to fight Jumabieke Tuerxun on November 8, 2014, at UFC Fight Night 55. He was victorious in the first round after knocking out Tuerxun with a head kick and follow-up punches.

Brimage faced promotional newcomer Cody Garbrandt on January 3, 2015, at UFC 182. He lost the fight via TKO in the third round.

Brimage was expected to face Ian Entwistle on July 18, 2015, at UFC Fight Night 72. However, Entwistle pulled out of the fight in late June for undisclosed reasons and was replaced by Jimmie Rivera. He lost the fight via KO in the first round. Subsequently, Brimage was released from the promotion.

Post-UFC career
Brimage dropped his third loss in a row when he took on bantamweight prospect Soo Chul Kim at Road FC 29 on March 12, 2016. He lost the fight via unanimous decision.

Brimage faced Leonardo Morales at MMA War 1 on June 25, 2016. He lost the fight via unanimous decision.

Over five years removed from his previous bout, Brimage, replacing injured Derek Campos, faced Kyle Bochniak at XMMA 2 on July 30, 2021. He lost the bout via unanimous decision.

On January 25, 2023, Brimage announced his retirement from MMA.

Mixed martial arts record

|-
|Loss
|align=center|7–8
|Kyle Bochniak
|Decision (unanimous)
|XMMA 2: Saunders vs. Nijem
|
|align=center|3
|align=center|5:00
|Greenville, South Carolina, United States
|  
|-
|Loss
|align=center|7–7
|Leonardo Morales
|Decision (unanimous)
|Viva Nicaragua Canal 13: MMA War
|
|align=center|3
|align=center|5:00
|Managua, Nicaragua
|Return to Featherweight.
|-
|Loss
|align=center|7–6
|Soo Chul Kim
|Decision (unanimous)
|Road FC 029 
|
|align=center|3
|align=center|5:00
|Wonju, South Korea
|
|-
|Loss
|align=center|7–5 
|Jimmie Rivera
|KO (punches)
|UFC Fight Night: Bisping vs. Leites 
|
|align=center|1
|align=center|1:29
|Glasgow, Scotland
|
|-
|Loss
|align=center|7–4
|Cody Garbrandt
|TKO (punches)
|UFC 182
|
|align=center|3
|align=center|4:50
|Las Vegas, Nevada, United States
|
|- 
|Win
|align=center|7–3
|Jumabieke Tuerxun
|KO (head kick)
|UFC Fight Night: Rockhold vs. Bisping
|
|align=center|1
|align=center|2:58
|Sydney, Australia
|
|- 
|Loss
|align=center|6–3
|Russell Doane
|Decision (split)
|UFC 175
|
|align=center|3
|align=center|5:00
|Las Vegas, Nevada, United States
|
|- 
|Loss
|align=center|6–2
|Conor McGregor
|TKO (punches)
|UFC on Fuel TV: Mousasi vs. Latifi
|
|align=center|1
|align=center|1:07
|Stockholm, Sweden
|
|- 
|Win
|align=center|6–1
|Jimy Hettes
|Decision (unanimous)
|UFC 152
|
|align=center|3
|align=center|5:00
|Toronto, Ontario, Canada
|
|- 
|Win
|align=center|5–1
|Maximo Blanco
|Decision (split)
|UFC 145
|
|align=center|3
|align=center|5:00
|Atlanta, Georgia, United States
|
|- 
|Win
|align=center|4–1
|Stephen Bass
|Decision (unanimous)  
|The Ultimate Fighter 14 Finale
|
|align=center|3
|align=center|5:00
|Las Vegas, Nevada, United States
|
|- 
|Win
|align=center|3–1
|Kyle Bradley
|TKO (punches)
|USA MMA 13
|
|align=center|1
|align=center|3:01
|Baton Rouge, Louisiana, United States
|
|- 
|Loss
|align=center|2–1
|Joey Camacho
|Submission (choke) 
|Iron Ring
|
|align=center|1
|align=center|1:27
|New Orleans, Louisiana, United States
|
|- 
|Win
|align=center|2–0
|Bryan Goldsby
|TKO (punches) 
|Xtreme Freestyle Fighting 7
|
|align=center|2
|align=center|1:07
|Birmingham, Alabama, United States
|
|- 
|Win
|align=center|1–0
|Jason Kwast
|Decision (unanimous)
|Georgia FC 2
|
|align=center|3
|align=center|5:00
|Georgia, United States
|

Bare knuckle record

|-
|Loss
|align=center|0–1–1
|Trevor Loken	
|TKO (punches)
|BKFC 35
|
|align=center|1
|align=center|0:40 
|Myrtle Beach, South Carolina, United States
|
|-
|Draw
|align=center|0–0–1
|Will Shutt	
|Draw (split)
|BKFC 22: Lombard vs. Hunt
| 
|align=center|5
|align=center|2:00
|Miami, Florida, United States
|
|-

See also
 List of male mixed martial artists

References

External links
 
 

1985 births
American male mixed martial artists
American sanshou practitioners
Mixed martial artists from Alabama
Living people
Lightweight mixed martial artists
Featherweight mixed martial artists
Bantamweight mixed martial artists
Sportspeople from Colorado Springs, Colorado
Sportspeople from Birmingham, Alabama
People from Coconut Creek, Florida
Ultimate Fighting Championship male fighters
Mixed martial artists utilizing sanshou
Wallace State Community College alumni
Faulkner University alumni